Florence Dawson  (31 May 1905 – 16 January 1993), better known by her stage name Florence Desmond, was an English actress, comedian and impersonator.

Biography

Early life 
Born in London in 1905, Desmond was educated at the Dame Alice Owen's School in Islington. Her brother, Fred Desmond, was a comedy acrobat from the "Desmond and Marks" double act.

Career
She began her stage career at the age of ten. Upon leaving school in 1920, she embarked on a long and successful career in the theatre, making her first public appearance performing comedy in the style of Nellie Wallace.  She was employed in 1925 by the impresario C. B. Cochran, and appeared in several revues.  In 1928, she toured the U.S. and Canada with Noel Coward and Beatrice Lillie, in This Year of Grace.

After returning to London, she developed an act which included both songs and impersonations of famous stars, and became popular for her theatre and cabaret appearances.  She also began appearing in many popular British films of the 1930s.  In 1933, she appeared on BBC radio in a broadcast in which she impersonated, among others, Janet Gaynor, Greta Garbo, Jimmy Durante, Gracie Fields, and Marlene Dietrich.  She repeated the performance for release as a 78 rpm record for His Master's Voice, "A Hollywood Party", which became a best-seller.  After another tour of the U.S., she returned to top the bill in London, adding an impersonation of Mae West to her repertoire, and featured in the 1937 Royal Variety Performance.  

She continued to tour in revues, and in 1941 starred with Max Miller and Vera Lynn in Apple Sauce, a revue which ran for over 400 performances at the London Palladium.  She continued to perform regularly at the Palladium after the end of the Second World War, and in 1951 made her second and final appearance in a Royal Variety Performance.  After retiring in 1954, she made a comeback in 1958 to appear with Beatrice Lillie in the play Auntie Mame in London.  She was the subject of This Is Your Life in 1959 when she was surprised by Eamonn Andrews at London's Adelphi Theatre.

Her recording of the risqué song "The Deepest Shelter in Town" has been featured in multiple World War II music compilations.

Personal life

She was married twice, first to the aviator Tom Campbell Black from 1935–1936 and, after Black's death, to aviator and insurance broker Charles Hughesdon from 1937 with whom she lived at Dunsborough Park in Ripley, Surrey. 

She died in Guildford, Surrey, in 1993, aged 87. A ward was named after her at St. Luke's Hospital, as well as a day unit at the Royal Surrey County Hospital.

Stage
Still Dancing, 1925–1926
This Year of Grace, 1928
Why Not To-night?, 1933–1934
Streamline, 1934
Funny Side Up, 1939–1940
Apple Sauce, 1940–1941
If the Shoe Fits, 1946
 Under the Counter, 1947

Filmography

References

 "Florence Desmond", by Florence Desmond, London: George G. Harrap and Co. Ltd, 1953. https://books.google.com/books?id=QJgrMQAACAAJ&dq=%22Florence+Desmond+By+Herself%22+Harrap&hl=en&sa=X&ved=0ahUKEwiQy7_mlbLWAhUo7oMKHc93AhoQ6AEIJjAA

External links

 
 Photographs and literature

1905 births
1993 deaths
Actresses from London
Actors from Guildford
English women comedians
English film actresses
English radio actresses
English stage actresses
People educated at Dame Alice Owen's School
20th-century English actresses
20th-century English comedians